Pang E or Zhao E was a Chinese noble woman from the Eastern Han dynasty to the Three Kingdoms period. Born in Gansu province, she was the mother of the Cao Wei politician, Pang Yui. She murdered her family's killer before turning herself in. Her case was recorded in Huangfu's Biographies of Exemplary Women which was supposed to be an instructional text for Confucian women. Due to her act of extreme bravery, she was immortalized as one of the memorable acts of courage and virtue performed by a woman in Chinese history. Zhao E was famous as one of the heroines depicted in the Wu Shuang Pu (無雙譜, Table of Peerless Heroes) by Jin Guliang.

Life 
Zhao E was married to a member of the Pang family. In 179 AD her father, Zhao An, was killed by his fellow countryman Li Shou. Other members of the Zhao household took ill and died. She and her three younger brothers plotted to avenge him only for the latter three to die from the plague before they could take action, days later her husband also died. When Li Shou learned of their misfortune, he held a banquet to celebrate his personal victory over the Zhao household, haughtily saying: "All the strong ones of the Zhao clan are now dead and only a weak daughter remains. I need worry no longer." These words were heard by Pang Yui, the son of Zhao E, and told to Zhao E, so that it inspired her to commit revenge. When Li Shou heard that Zhao E wanted to kill him, he rode a horse with a sword into the street to protect himself against it. Because of his fierce personality, the villagers feared Li Shou. Her neighbors feared that Zhao E would not be able to defeat Li Shou, trying to dissuade her, but she still insists on not letting go of her revenge.

She secretly bought a sword and sharpened it day and night, hoping to defeat her enemy, the advice of her family and neighbors made her more determined to kill Li Shou, so she left her family affairs and focused on waiting for the opportunity to kill him.

One morning in early February 179, Zhao E armed herself with a sword and set out to find him. She encountered Li Shou in broad daylight and stabbed his horse, causing him to fall from it. She then fought with Li Shou and killed him, then cut off his head. While holding Li Shou's head, she immediately turned herself in to the authorities and asked to be executed. 

Despite awaiting the execution of her act, she was pardoned by officials who were sympathetic to her cause. It is said that Magistrate Yin Jia did not want her to be punished upon learning of her circumstances to the point that he was willing to relinquish his office so that she could live. Yin Jia was going to resign so as not to judge her, but Yan Chen firmly accepted the accusation. The people heard the news, and they came in greater and greater numbers, and all supported her. The district lieutenant did not dare arrest Zhao E, implicitly advised her to leave Tang County, and forced her to go home. Zhao E's insistence on obeying the law earned her many admirers who escorted her home, her legacy was spread throughout the nation and she was greatly revered.

An amnesty was issued thus she was able to escape punishment honorably. In admiration of her sense of duty the provincial authorities set up a stele at her gate while such courage and enterprise displayed by a woman were reported to the court and celebrated across the empire. Her son, Pang Yu, also earned a reputation for his courage and loyalty, he was appointed Marquis of Guannei during the reign of Emperor Wen of Wei.

See also 
Xiahou Lingnu, another woman from the Three Kingdoms who was inserted in the Hungfu Mi's Biographies of Exemplary Women.

References 

 

People from Jiuquan
People of Cao Wei
Cao Cao and associates
Women in ancient Chinese warfare
2nd-century Chinese women
2nd-century Chinese people
Legendary Chinese people